The 47th United States Congress was a meeting of the legislative branch of the United States federal government, consisting of the United States Senate and the United States House of Representatives. It met in Washington, D.C. from March 4, 1881, to March 4, 1883, during the six months of James Garfield's presidency, and the first year and a half of Chester Arthur's presidency. The apportionment of seats in this House of Representatives was based on the 1870 United States census. The House had a Republican majority; the Senate was evenly divided for the first time ever, with no vice president to break ties for most of this term.

Party summary
The count below identifies party affiliations at the beginning of the first session of this Congress, and includes members from vacancies and newly admitted states, when they were first seated. Changes resulting from subsequent replacements are shown below in the "Changes in membership" section.

Senate

House of Representatives

Leadership

Senate 

 President: Chester A. Arthur (R), until September 19, 1881; vacant thereafter
 President pro tempore: Thomas F. Bayard (D), October 10, 1881 – October 13, 1881
 David Davis (I), from October 13, 1881
 George F. Edmunds (R), from March 3, 1883
 Democratic Caucus Chairman: George H. Pendleton
 Republican Conference Chairman: Henry B. Anthony

House of Representatives 

 Speaker: J. Warren Keifer (R)
 Republican Conference Chairman: George M. Robeson

Major events

March 4, 1881: James A. Garfield became President of the United States
September 19, 1881: President Garfield died. Vice President Chester A. Arthur became President of the United States

Major legislation

 February 25, 1882: Apportionment of the Tenth Census, ch. 20, 
 May 6, 1882: Chinese Exclusion Act, 
 August 2, 1882: Passenger Act of 1882, 
 August 2, 1882: Rivers and Harbors Act
 January 16, 1883: Pendleton Civil Service Reform Act, ch. 27, 
 March 3, 1883: Tariff of 1883 (Mongrel Tariff)

Members
This list is arranged by chamber, then by state. Senators are listed by class, and representatives are listed by district.

Skip to House of Representatives, below

Senate
Senators were elected by the state legislatures every two years, with one-third beginning new six-year terms with each Congress. Preceding the names in the list below are Senate class numbers, which indicate the cycle of their election.

Alabama 
 2. John T. Morgan (D)
 3. James L. Pugh (D)

Arkansas 
 2. Augustus H. Garland (D)
 3. James D. Walker (D)

California 
 1. John F. Miller (R)
 3. James T. Farley (D)

Colorado 
 2. Henry M. Teller (R), until April 17, 1882
 George M. Chilcott (R), April 17, 1882 - January 27, 1883
 Horace A. W. Tabor (R), from January 27, 1883
 3. Nathaniel P. Hill (R)

Connecticut 
 1. Joseph R. Hawley (R)
 3. Orville H. Platt (R)

Delaware 
 1. Thomas F. Bayard Sr. (D)
 2. Eli M. Saulsbury (D)

Florida 
 1. Charles W. Jones (D)
 3. Wilkinson Call (D)

Georgia 
 2. Benjamin H. Hill (D), until August 16, 1882
 M. Pope Barrow (D), from November 15, 1882
 3. Joseph E. Brown (D)

Illinois 
 2. David Davis (I)
 3. John A. Logan (R)

Indiana 
 1. Benjamin Harrison (R)
 3. Daniel W. Voorhees (D)

Iowa 
 2. Samuel J. Kirkwood (R), until March 7, 1881
 James W. McDill (R), from March 8, 1881
 3. William B. Allison (R)

Kansas 
 2. Preston B. Plumb (R)
 3. John J. Ingalls (R)

Kentucky 
 2. James B. Beck (D)
 3. John S. Williams (D)

Louisiana 
 2. William Pitt Kellogg (R)
 3. Benjamin F. Jonas (D)

Maine 
 1. Eugene Hale (R)
 2. James G. Blaine (R), until March 5, 1881
 William P. Frye (R), from March 15, 1881

Maryland 
 1. Arthur Pue Gorman (D)
 3. James B. Groome (D)

Massachusetts 
 1. Henry L. Dawes (R)
 2. George F. Hoar (R)

Michigan 
 1. Omar D. Conger (R)
 2. Thomas W. Ferry (R)

Minnesota 
 1. Samuel J. R. McMillan (R)
 2. William Windom (R),until March 7, 1881
 Alonzo J. Edgerton (R), March 12, 1881 – October 30, 1881
 William Windom (R), from November 15, 1881

Mississippi 
 1. James Z. George (D)
 2. Lucius Q. C. Lamar (D)

Missouri 
 1. Francis M. Cockrell (D)
 3. George G. Vest (D)

Nebraska 
 1. Charles H. Van Wyck (R)
 2. Alvin Saunders (R)

Nevada 
 1. James G. Fair (D)
 3. John P. Jones (R)

New Hampshire 
 2. Edward H. Rollins (R)
 3. Henry W. Blair (R)

New Jersey 
 1. William J. Sewell (R)
 2. John R. McPherson (D)

New York 
 1. Thomas C. Platt (R), until May 16, 1881
 Warner Miller (R), from July 27, 1881
 3. Roscoe Conkling (R), until May 16, 1881
 Elbridge G. Lapham (R), from July 29, 1881

North Carolina 
 2. Matt W. Ransom (D)
 3. Zebulon B. Vance (D)

Ohio 
 1. John Sherman (R)
 3. George H. Pendleton (D)

Oregon 
 2. La Fayette Grover (D)
 3. James H. Slater (D)

Pennsylvania 
 1. John I. Mitchell (R)
 3. J. Donald Cameron (R)

Rhode Island 
 1. Ambrose E. Burnside (R), until September 13, 1881
 Nelson W. Aldrich (R), from October 5, 1881
 2. Henry B. Anthony (R)

South Carolina 
 2. Matthew C. Butler (D)
 3. Wade Hampton III (D)

Tennessee 
 1. Howell E. Jackson (D)
 2. Isham G. Harris (D)

Texas 
 1. Samuel B. Maxey (D)
 2. Richard Coke (D)

Vermont 
 1. George F. Edmunds (R)
 3. Justin S. Morrill (R)

Virginia 
 1. William Mahone (RA)
 2. John W. Johnston (D)

West Virginia 
 1. Johnson N. Camden (D)
 2. Henry G. Davis (D)

Wisconsin 
 1. Philetus Sawyer (R)
 3. Angus Cameron (R), from March 14, 1881

House of Representatives
Members' names are preceded by their district numbers.

Alabama 
 . Thomas H. Herndon (D)
 . Hilary A. Herbert (D)
 . William C. Oates (D)
 . Charles M. Shelley (D), until July 20, 1882
 Charles M. Shelley (D), from November 7, 1882
 . Thomas Williams (D)
 . Goldsmith W. Hewitt (D)
 . William H. Forney (D)
 . Joseph Wheeler (D), until June 3, 1882
 William M. Lowe (GB), June 3, 1882 – October 12, 1882
 Joseph Wheeler (D), from January 15, 1883

Arkansas 
 . Poindexter Dunn (D)
 . James K. Jones (D)
 . Jordan E. Cravens (D)
 . Thomas M. Gunter (D)

California 
 . William S. Rosecrans (D)
 . Horace F. Page (R)
 . Campbell P. Berry (D)
 . Romualdo Pacheco (R)

Colorado 
 . James B. Belford (R)

Connecticut 
 . John R. Buck (R)
 . James Phelps (D)
 . John T. Wait (R)
 . Frederick Miles (R)

Delaware 
 . Edward L. Martin (D)

Florida 
 . Robert H. M. Davidson (D)
 . Jesse J. Finley (D), until June 1, 1882
 Horatio Bisbee Jr. (R), from June 1, 1882

Georgia 
 . George R. Black (D)
 . Henry G. Turner (D)
 . Philip Cook (D)
 . Hugh Buchanan (D)
 . Nathaniel J. Hammond (D)
 . James H. Blount (D)
 . Judson C. Clements (D)
 . Alexander H. Stephens (D), until November 4, 1882
 Seaborn Reese (D), from December 4, 1882
 . Emory Speer (ID)

Illinois 
 . William Aldrich (R)
 . George R. Davis (R)
 . Charles B. Farwell (R)
 . John C. Sherwin (R)
 . Robert M. A. Hawk (R), until June 29, 1882
 Robert R. Hitt (R), from December 4, 1882
 . Thomas J. Henderson (R)
 . William Cullen (R)
 . Lewis E. Payson (R)
 . John H. Lewis (R)
 . Benjamin F. Marsh (R)
 . James W. Singleton (D)
 . William M. Springer (D)
 . Dietrich C. Smith (R)
 . Joseph G. Cannon (R)
 . Samuel W. Moulton (D)
 . William A. J. Sparks (D)
 . William R. Morrison (D)
 . John R. Thomas (R)
 . Richard W. Townshend (D)

Indiana 
 . William Heilman (R)
 . Thomas R. Cobb (D)
 . Strother M. Stockslager (D)
 . William S. Holman (D)
 . Courtland C. Matson (D)
 . Thomas M. Browne (R)
 . Stanton J. Peelle (R)
 . Robert B. F. Peirce (R)
 . Godlove S. Orth (R), until December 16, 1882
 Charles T. Doxey (R), from January 17, 1883
 . Mark L. De Motte (R)
 . George W. Steele (R)
 . Walpole G. Colerick (D)
 . William H. Calkins (R)

Iowa 
 . Moses A. McCoid (R)
 . Sewall S. Farwell (R)
 . Thomas Updegraff (R)
 . Nathaniel C. Deering (R)
 . William G. Thompson (R)
 . Marsena E. Cutts (R), until March 3, 1883
 John C. Cook (D), from March 3, 1883
 . John A. Kasson (R)
 . William P. Hepburn (R)
 . Cyrus C. Carpenter (R)

Kansas 
 . John A. Anderson (R)
 . Dudley C. Haskell (R)
 . Thomas Ryan (R)

Kentucky 
 . Oscar Turner (D)
 . James A. McKenzie (D)
 . John William Caldwell (D)
 . J. Proctor Knott (D)
 . Albert S. Willis (D)
 . John G. Carlisle (D)
 . Joseph C. S. Blackburn (D)
 . Philip B. Thompson Jr. (D)
 . John D. White (R)
 . Elijah C. Phister (D)

Louisiana 
 . Randall L. Gibson (D)
 . E. John Ellis (D)
 . Chester B. Darrall (R)
 . Newton C. Blanchard (D)
 . J. Floyd King (D)
 . Edward W. Robertson (D)

Maine 
 . Thomas B. Reed (R)
 . William P. Frye (R), until March 17, 1881
 Nelson Dingley Jr. (R) from September 12, 1881
 . Stephen D. Lindsey (R)
 . George W. Ladd (GB)
 . Thompson H. Murch (GB)

Maryland 
 . George W. Covington (D)
 . J. Frederick C. Talbott (D)
 . Fetter S. Hoblitzell (D)
 . Robert M. McLane (D)
 . Andrew G. Chapman (D)
 . Milton G. Urner (R)

Massachusetts 
 . William W. Crapo (R)
 . Benjamin W. Harris (R)
 . Ambrose A. Ranney (R)
 . Leopold Morse (D)
 . Selwyn Z. Bowman (R)
 . Eben F. Stone (R)
 . William A. Russell (R)
 . John W. Candler (R)
 . William W. Rice (R)
 . Amasa Norcross (R)
 . George D. Robinson (R)

Michigan 
 . Henry W. Lord (R)
 . Edwin Willits (R)
 . Edward S. Lacey (R)
 . Julius C. Burrows (R)
 . George W. Webber (R)
 . Oliver L. Spaulding (R)
 . John T. Rich (R), from April 5, 1881
 . Roswell G. Horr (R)
 . Jay A. Hubbell (R)

Minnesota 
 . Mark H. Dunnell (R)
 . Horace B. Strait (R)
 . William D. Washburn (R)

Mississippi 
 . Henry L. Muldrow (D)
 . Vannoy H. Manning (D)
 . Hernando Money (D)
 . Otho R. Singleton (D)
 . Charles E. Hooker (D)
 . James R. Chalmers (D), until April 29, 1882
 John R. Lynch (R), from April 29, 1882

Missouri 
 . Martin L. Clardy (D)
 . Thomas Allen (D), until April 8, 1882
 James Henry McLean (R), from December 15, 1882
 . Richard G. Frost (D), until March 2, 1883
 Gustavus Sessinghaus (R), from March 2, 1883
 . Lowndes H. Davis (D)
 . Richard P. Bland (D)
 . Ira Hazeltine (GB)
 . Theron M. Rice (GB)
 . Robert T. Van Horn (R)
 . Nicholas Ford (GB)
 . Joseph H. Burrows (GB)
 . John B. Clark Jr. (D)
 . William H. Hatch (D)
 . Aylett H. Buckner (D)

Nebraska 
 . Edward K. Valentine (R)

Nevada 
 . George W. Cassidy (D)

New Hampshire 
 . Joshua G. Hall (R)
 . James F. Briggs (R)
 . Ossian Ray (R)

New Jersey 
 . George M. Robeson (R)
 . J. Hart Brewer (R)
 . Miles Ross (D)
 . Henry S. Harris (D)
 . John Hill (R)
 . Phineas Jones (R)
 . Augustus A. Hardenbergh (D)

New York 
 . Perry Belmont (D)
 . William E. Robinson (D)
 . J. Hyatt Smith (I)
 . Archibald M. Bliss (D)
 . Benjamin Wood (D)
 . Samuel S. Cox (D)
 . P. Henry Dugro (D)
 . Anson G. McCook (R)
 . John Hardy (D), from December 5, 1881
 . Abram S. Hewitt (D)
 . Levi P. Morton (R), until March 21, 1881
 Roswell P. Flower (D), from November 8, 1881
 . Waldo Hutchins (D)
 . John H. Ketcham (R)
 . Lewis Beach (D)
 . Thomas Cornell (R)
 . Michael N. Nolan (D)
 . Walter A. Wood (R)
 . John Hammond (R)
 . Abraham X. Parker (R)
 . George West (R)
 . Ferris Jacobs Jr. (R)
 . Warner Miller (R), until July 26, 1881
 Charles R. Skinner (R) from November 18, 1881
 . Cyrus D. Prescott (R)
 . Joseph Mason (R)
 . Frank Hiscock (R)
 . John H. Camp (R)
 . Elbridge G. Lapham (R), until July 29, 1881
 James W. Wadsworth (R), from November 8, 1881
 . Jeremiah W. Dwight (R)
 . David P. Richardson (R)
 . John Van Voorhis (R)
 . Richard Crowley (R)
 . Jonathan Scoville (D)
 . Henry H. Van Aernam (R)

North Carolina 
 . Louis C. Latham (D)
 . Orlando Hubbs (R)
 . John W. Shackelford (D), until January 18, 1883
 . William Ruffin Cox (D)
 . Alfred M. Scales (D)
 . Clement Dowd (D)
 . Robert F. Armfield (D)
 . Robert B. Vance (D)

Ohio 
 . Benjamin Butterworth (R)
 . Thomas L. Young (R)
 . Henry L. Morey (R)
 . Emanuel Shultz (R)
 . Benjamin Le Fevre (D)
 . James M. Ritchie (R)
 . John P. Leedom (D)
 . J. Warren Keifer (R)
 . James S. Robinson (R)
 . John B. Rice (R)
 . Henry S. Neal (R)
 . George L. Converse (D)
 . Gibson Atherton (D)
 . George W. Geddes (D)
 . Rufus R. Dawes (R)
 . Jonathan T. Updegraff (R), until November 30, 1882
 Joseph D. Taylor (R), from January 2, 1883
 . William McKinley (R)
 . Addison S. McClure (R)
 . Ezra B. Taylor (R)
 . Amos Townsend (R)

Oregon 
 . Melvin C. George (R)

Pennsylvania 
 . Henry H. Bingham (R)
 . Charles O'Neill (R)
 . Samuel J. Randall (D)
 . William D. Kelley (R)
 . Alfred C. Harmer (R)
 . William Ward (R)
 . William Godshalk (R)
 . Daniel Ermentrout (D)
 . A. Herr Smith (R)
 . William Mutchler (D)
 . Robert Klotz (D)
 . Joseph A. Scranton (R)
 . Charles N. Brumm (GB)
 . Samuel F. Barr (R)
 . Cornelius C. Jadwin (R)
 . Robert J. C. Walker (R)
 . Jacob M. Campbell (R)
 . Horatio G. Fisher (R)
 . Frank E. Beltzhoover (D)
 . Andrew G. Curtin (D)
 . Morgan R. Wise (D)
 . Russell Errett (R)
 . Thomas M. Bayne (R)
 . William S. Shallenberger (R)
 . James Mosgrove (GB)
 . Samuel H. Miller (R)
 . Lewis F. Watson (R)

Rhode Island 
 . Nelson W. Aldrich (R), until October 4, 1881
 Henry J. Spooner (R), from December 5, 1881
 . Jonathan Chace (R)

South Carolina 
 . John S. Richardson (D)
 . Michael P. O'Connor (D), until April 26, 1881
 Samuel Dibble (D), June 9, 1881 – May 31, 1882
 Edmund W. M. Mackey (IR), from May 31, 1882
 . D. Wyatt Aiken (D)
 . John H. Evins (D)
 . George D. Tillman (D), until June 19, 1882
 Robert Smalls (R), from July 19, 1882

Tennessee 
 . Augustus H. Pettibone (R)
 . Leonidas C. Houk (R)
 . George G. Dibrell (D)
 . Benton McMillin (D)
 . Richard Warner (D)
 . John F. House (D)
 . Washington C. Whitthorne (D)
 . John D. C. Atkins (D)
 . Charles B. Simonton (D)
 . William R. Moore (R)

Texas 
 . John H. Reagan (D)
 . David B. Culberson (D)
 . Olin Wellborn (D)
 . Roger Q. Mills (D)
 . George W. Jones (GB)
 . Christopher C. Upson (D)

Vermont 
 . Charles H. Joyce (R)
 . James M. Tyler (R)
 . William W. Grout (R)

Virginia 
 . George T. Garrison (D)
 . John F. Dezendorf (R)
 . George D. Wise (D)
 . Joseph Jorgensen (R)
 . George Cabell (D)
 . John R. Tucker (D)
 . John Paul (D)
 . John S. Barbour Jr. (D)
 . Abram Fulkerson (D)

West Virginia 
 . Benjamin Wilson (D)
 . John B. Hoge (D)
 . John E. Kenna (D)

Wisconsin 
 . Charles G. Williams (R)
 . Lucien B. Caswell (R)
 . George C. Hazelton (R)
 . Peter V. Deuster (D)
 . Edward S. Bragg (D)
 . Richard W. Guenther (R)
 . Herman L. Humphrey (R)
 . Thaddeus C. Pound (R)

Non-voting delegates 
 . Granville H. Oury (D)
 . Richard F. Pettigrew (R)
 . George Ainslie (D)
 . Martin Maginnis (D)
 . Tranqulino Luna (R)
 . John T. Caine (D)
 . Thomas H. Brents (R)
 . Morton E. Post (D)

Changes in membership
The count below reflects changes from the beginning of this Congress.

Senate 

Deaths: 2
Resignations: 8
Interim appointments: 1
Total replacements: 8
 Democratic: no net change
 Republican: no net change
Total seats with changes: 10

|-
| Wisconsin (3)
| Vacant
| Senator Matthew H. Carpenter died in the previous congress.Successor elected March 14, 1881.
| nowrap  | Angus Cameron (R)
| March 14, 1881

|-
| Maine (2)
| nowrap  | James G. Blaine (R)
| Resigned March 5, 1881, to become U.S. Secretary of State.Successor elected March 18, 1881.
| nowrap  | William P. Frye (R)
| March 18, 1881

|-
| Iowa (2)
| nowrap  | Samuel J. Kirkwood (R)
| Resigned March 7, 1881, to become U.S. Secretary of the Interior.Successor appointed March 8, 1881, to continue the term.Appointee elected January 25, 1882, to finish the term.
| nowrap  | James W. McDill (R)
| March 8, 1881

|-
| Minnesota (2)
| nowrap  | William Windom (R)
| Resigned March 7, 1881, to become U.S. Secretary of the Treasury.Successor appointed March 12, 1881, to continue the term.
| nowrap  | Alonzo J. Edgerton (R)
| March 12, 1881

|-
| New York (1)
| nowrap  | Thomas C. Platt (R)
| Resigned May 16, 1881, as a protest against federal appointments made in New York.Successor elected October 11, 1881.
| nowrap  | Warner Miller (R)
| July 27, 1881

|-
| New York (3)
| nowrap  | Roscoe Conkling (R)
| Resigned May 16, 1881, as a protest against federal appointments made in New York.Successor elected October 11, 1881.
| nowrap  | Elbridge G. Lapham (R)
| August 2, 1881

|-
| Rhode Island (1)
| nowrap  | Ambrose Burnside (R)
| Died September 13, 1881.Successor elected October 5, 1881.
| nowrap  | Nelson W. Aldrich (R)
| October 5, 1881

|-
| Minnesota (2)
| nowrap  | Alonzo J. Edgerton (R)
| Interim appointee replaced by successor elected October 30, 1881.
| nowrap  | William Windom (R)
| November 15, 1881

|-
| Colorado (2)
| nowrap  | Henry M. Teller (R)
| Resigned April 17, 1882, to become U.S. Secretary of the Interior.Successor appointed April 17, 1882.
| nowrap  | George M. Chilcott (R)
| April 17, 1882

|-
| Georgia (2)
| nowrap  | Benjamin H. Hill (D)
| Died August 16, 1882.Successor elected November 15, 1882.
| nowrap  | M. Pope Barrow (D)
| November 15, 1882

|-
| Colorado (2)
| nowrap  | George M. Chilcott (R)
| Interim appointee replaced by successor elected January 27, 1883.
| nowrap  | Horace Tabor (R)
| January 27, 1883
|}

House of Representatives 

Deaths: 6
Resignations: 9
Contested elections: 8
Total replacements: 14
 Democratic: 1 seat net gain
 Republican: 1 seat net loss
Total seats with changes: 22

|-
| 
| Vacant
| Rep. Omar D. Conger resigned during previous congress
| nowrap  | John T. Rich (R)
| April 5, 1881

|-
| 
| Vacant
| Rep. Fernando Wood elected but died before Congress convened
| nowrap  | John Hardy (D)
| December 5, 1881

|-
| 
| nowrap  | William P. Frye (R)
| Resigned March 17, 1881 when elected U.S. Senator.
| nowrap  | Nelson Dingley Jr. (R)
| September 12, 1881

|-
| 
| nowrap  | Levi P. Morton (R)
| Resigned March 21, 1881 to become U.S. Minister to France.
| nowrap  | Roswell P. Flower (D)
| November 8, 1881

|-
| 
| nowrap  | Michael P. O'Connor (D)
| Died April 26, 1881, during a contested election. Dibble presented credentials to replace him due to his death.
| nowrap  | Samuel Dibble (D)
| June 9, 1881

|-
| 
| nowrap  | Warner Miller (R)
| Resigned July 26, 1881 when elected U.S. Senator.
| nowrap  | Charles R. Skinner (R)
| November 8, 1881

|-
| 
| nowrap  | Elbridge G. Lapham (R)
| Resigned July 29, 1881 when elected U.S. Senator.
| nowrap  | James W. Wadsworth (R)
| November 8, 1881

|-
| 
| nowrap  | Nelson W. Aldrich (R)
| Resigned October 5, 1881 when elected U.S. Senator.Successor elected November 22, 1881.
| nowrap  | Henry J. Spooner (R)
| December 5, 1881

|-
| 
| nowrap  | Thomas Allen (D)
| Died April 8, 1882
| nowrap  | James H. McLean (R)
| December 15, 1882

|-
| 
| nowrap  | James R. Chalmers (D)
| Lost contested election April 29, 1882
| nowrap  | John R. Lynch (R)
| April 29, 1882

|-
| 
| nowrap  | Samuel Dibble (D)
| Lost contested election May 31, 1882, during an election originally contested with Michael P. O'Connor. Dibble presented credentials to replace him until Mackey was determined to be the victor under terms of the original election.
| nowrap  | Edmund W. M. Mackey (IR)
| May 31, 1882

|-
| 
| nowrap  | Jesse J. Finley (D)
| Lost contested election June 1, 1882
| nowrap  | Horatio Bisbee Jr. (R)
| June 1, 1882

|-
| 
| nowrap  | Joseph Wheeler (D)
| Lost contested election June 3, 1882
| nowrap  | William M. Lowe (GB)
| June 3, 1882

|-
| 
| nowrap  | Robert M. A. Hawk (R)
| Died June 29, 1882
| nowrap  | Robert R. Hitt (R)
| November 7, 1882

|-
| 
| nowrap  | George D. Tillman (D)
| Lost contested election July 19, 1882
| nowrap  | Robert Smalls (R)
| July 19, 1882

|-
| 
| nowrap  | Charles M. Shelley (D)
| Election contested by James Q. Smith.Seat declared vacant July 20, 1882.Shelley re-elected to fill seat.
| nowrap  | Charles M. Shelley (D)
| November 7, 1882

|-
| 
| nowrap  | William M. Lowe (GB)
| Died October 12, 1882
| nowrap  | Joseph Wheeler (D)
| January 15, 1883

|-
| 
| nowrap  | Alexander H. Stephens (D)
| Resigned November 4, 1882 when elected Governor of Georgia.
| nowrap  | Seaborn Reese (D)
| December 4, 1882

|-
| 
| nowrap  | Jonathan T. Updegraff (R)
| Died November 30, 1882
| nowrap  | Joseph D. Taylor (R)
| January 2, 1883

|-
| 
| nowrap  | Godlove S. Orth (R)
| Died December 16, 1882
| nowrap  | Charles T. Doxey (R)
| January 17, 1883

|-
| 
| nowrap  | John W. Shackelford (D)
| Died January 18, 1883
| Vacant
| Not filled this term

|-
| 
| nowrap  | Richard G. Frost (D)
| Lost contested election March 2, 1883
| nowrap  | Gustavus Sessinghaus (R)
| March 2, 1883

|-
| 
| nowrap  | Marsena E. Cutts (R)
| Lost election contest March 3, 1883
| nowrap  | John C. Cook (D)
| March 3, 1883

|}

Committees

Senate

 Additional Accommodations for the Library of Congress (Select) (Chairman: Daniel W. Voorhees; Ranking Member: N/A)
 Agriculture (Chairman: William Mahone; Ranking Member: Henry G. Davis)
 Appropriations (Chairman: William B. Allison; Ranking Member: Henry G. Davis)
 Audit and Control the Contingent Expenses of the Senate (Chairman: John P. Jones; Ranking Member: Zebulon B. Vance)
 Cabinet Officers on the Floor of the Senate (Select)
 Civil Service and Retrenchment (Chairman: Joseph R. Hawley; Ranking Member: Matthew C. Butler)
 Claims (Chairman: Angus Cameron; Ranking Member: James L. Pugh)
 Commerce (Chairman: Samuel J.R. McMillan; Ranking Member: Matt W. Ransom) 
 Distilled Spirit Tax Bill (Select)
 Distributing Public Revenue Among the States (Select)
 District of Columbia (Chairman: John J. Ingalls; Ranking Member: Isham G. Harris)
 Education and Labor (Chairman: Henry W. Blair; Ranking Member: Samuel B. Maxey)
 Engrossed Bills (Chairman: Eli Saulsbury; Ranking Member: Warner Miller)
 Enrolled Bills (Chairman: William J. Sewell; Ranking Member: James L. Pugh)
 Epidemic Diseases (Select) (Chairman: Isham G. Harris; Ranking Member: Henry M. Teller)
 Examine the Several Branches in the Civil Service (Select)
 Finance (Chairman: Justin S. Morrill; Ranking Member: Thomas F. Bayard)
 Foreign Relations (Chairman: William Windom; Ranking Member: John W. Johnston)
 Indian Affairs (Chairman: Henry L. Dawes; Ranking Member: Richard Coke)
 Judiciary (Chairman: George F. Edmunds; Ranking Member: Augustus H. Garland)
 Manufactures (Chairman: Omar D. Conger; Ranking Member: John R. McPherson)
 Military Affairs (Chairman: John A. Logan; Ranking Member: Francis M. Cockrell)
 Mines and Mining (Chairman: Nathaniel P. Hill; Ranking Member: Wade Hampton)
 Mississippi River and its Tributaries (Select) (Chairman: Charles H. Van Wyck; Ranking Member: Benjamin F. Jonas)
 Naval Affairs (Chairman: J. Donald Cameron; Ranking Member: John R. McPherson)
 Nicaraguan Claims (Select) (Chairman: Henry G. Davis; Ranking Member: Nathaniel P. Hill)
 Ordnance and Gunnery (Select)
 Ordnance and Projectiles (Select)
 Ordnance and War Ships (Select)
 Patents (Chairman: Orville H. Platt; Ranking Member: Richard Coke)
 Pensions (Chairman: John I. Mitchell; Ranking Member: James B. Groome)
 Post Office and Post Roads (Chairman: Thomas W. Ferry; Ranking Member: Samuel B. Maxey)
 Potomac River Front (Select)
 Private Land Claims (Chairman: Thomas F. Bayard; Ranking Member: George F. Edmunds)
 Privileges and Elections (Chairman: George F. Hoar; Ranking Member: Eli Saulsbury)
 Public Lands (Chairman: Preston B. Plumb; Ranking Member: Charles W. Jones)
 Railroads (Chairman: William P. Kellogg; Ranking Member: Lucius Quintus Cincinnatus Lamar) 
 Revenue Collections in North Carolina (Special)
 Revision of the Laws (Chairman: John F. Miller; Ranking Member: David Davis)
 Revolutionary Claims (Chairman: John W. Johnston; Ranking Member: Henry B. Anthony)
 Rules (Chairman: William P. Frye; Ranking Member: Wilkinson Call)
 Sioux and Crow Indians (Select)
 Tariff Regulation (Select)
 Tenth Census (Select) (Chairman: Eugene Hale; Ranking Member: George H. Pendleton)
 Territories (Chairman: Alvin Saunders; Ranking Member: Matthew C. Butler)
 Transportation Routes to the Seaboard (Chairman: Benjamin Harrison; Ranking Member: James B. Beck)
 Whole
 Woman Suffrage (Select) (Chairman: Elbridge G. Lapham; Ranking Member: James Z. George)

House of Representatives

 Accounts (Chairman: Milton G. Urner; Ranking Member: Edward L. Martin)  
 Alcoholic Liquor Traffic (Select) (Chairman: John T. Wait; Ranking Member: Thomas Williams)
 Agriculture (Chairman: Edward K. Valentine; Ranking Member: William Cullen)
 Appropriations (Chairman: Frank Hiscock; Ranking Member: John H. Ketcham)
 Banking and Currency (Chairman: William W. Crapo; Ranking Member: John H. Ketcham) 
 Claims (Chairman: Richard Crowley; Ranking Member: Robert J.C. Walker)
 Coinage, Weights and Measures (Chairman: Horatio G. Fisher; Ranking Member: Ira S. Hazeltine)
 Commerce (Chairman: Horace F. Page; Ranking Member: Melvin C. George)
 District of Columbia (Chairman: Henry S. Neal; Ranking Member: John F. Dezendorf)
 Education and Labor (Chairman: John C. Sherwin; Ranking Member: Albert S. Willis)
 Elections (Chairman: William H. Calkins; Ranking Member: Ferris Jacobs Jr.)
 Enrolled Bills (Chairman: William Aldrich; Ranking Member: Cornelius C. Jadwin)
 Expenditures in the Interior Department (Chairman: Jay Abel Hubbell; Ranking Member: Charles B. Simonton)
 Expenditures in the Justice Department (Chairman: Edwin Willits; Ranking Member: Otho R. Singleton)
 Expenditures in the Navy Department (Chairman: George M. Robeson; Ranking Member: Leopold Morse)
 Expenditures in the Post Office Department (Chairman: Joseph G. Cannon; Ranking Member: John H. Reagan)
 Expenditures in the State Department (Chairman: Nathaniel C. Deering; Ranking Member: Thomas H. Herndon)
 Expenditures in the Treasury Department (Chairman: James B. Belford; Ranking Member: William H. Forney)
 Expenditures in the War Department (Chairman: James F. Briggs; Ranking Member: Joseph Clay Stiles Blackburn)
 Expenditures on Public Buildings (Chairman: Russell Errett; Ranking Member: Morgan R. Wise)
 Foreign Affairs (Chairman: Charles G. Williams; Ranking Member: Robert J.C. Walker)
 Indian Affairs (Chairman: Dudley C. Haskell; Ranking Member: David P. Richardson)
 Invalid Pensions (Chairman: Thomas M. Browne; Ranking Member: James Wolcott Wadsworth)
 Judiciary (Chairman: Thomas B. Reed; Ranking Member: Amasa Norcross) 
 Levees and Improvements of the Mississippi River (Chairman: John R. Thomas; Ranking Member: Julius C. Burrows)
 Manufactures (Chairman: James M. Campbell; Ranking Member: Jonathan Chace)
 Memorial on Services Rendered by Carlisle P. Patterson (Select) (Chairman: John A. Kasson; Ranking Member: John D.C. Atkins)
 Mileage (Chairman: Joseph Jorgensen; Ranking Member: Thomas R. Cobb)
 Military Affairs (Chairman: Thomas J. Henderson; Ranking Member: Henry J. Spooner)
 Militia (Chairman: Horace B. Strait; Ranking Member: Edward K. Valentine)
 Mines and Mining (Chairman: John Van Voorhis; Ranking Member: Thomas L. Young)
 Naval Affairs (Chairman: Benjamin W. Harris; Ranking Member: John F. Dezendorf)
 Pacific Railroads (Chairman: George C. Hazelton; Ranking Member: Charles B. Farwell)
 Patents (Chairman: Thomas L. Young; Ranking Member: Henry J. Spooner)
 Pensions (Chairman: Benjamin F. Marsh; Ranking Member: Dietrich C. Smith)
 Post Office and Post Roads (Chairman: Henry H. Bingham; Ranking Member: Henry L. Morey)
 Public Buildings and Grounds (Chairman: William S. Shallenberger; Ranking Member: J. Hyatt Smith)
 Public Expenditures (Chairman: Samuel J. Randall; Ranking Member: George W. Ladd)
 Public Lands (Chairman: Thaddeus C. Pound; Ranking Member: Theron M. Rice)
 Private Land Claims (Chairman: Romualdo Pacheco; Ranking Member: Henry L. Muldrow)
 Railways and Canals (Chairman: Amos Townsend; Ranking Member: J. Hart Brewer)
 Revision of Laws (Chairman: William McKinley; Ranking Member: Cornelius C. Jadwin)
 Rules (Chairman: J. Warren Keifer; Ranking Member: Joseph Clay Stiles Blackburn)
 Standards of Official Conduct
 Territories (Chairman: Julius C. Burrows; Ranking Member: William W. Grout)
 War Claims (Chairman: Leonidas C. Houk; Ranking Member: Edward W. Robertson)
 Ways and Means (Chairman: William D. Kelley; Ranking Member: Russell Errett)
 Whole

Joint committees

 American Shipbuilding (Select)
 Budget Control
 Conditions of Indian Tribes (Special)
 Enrolled Bills (Chairman: Sen. William Aldrich; Vice Chairman: Rep. John E. Kenna)
 The Library (Chairman: Sen. John Sherman; Vice Chairman: Rep. George W. Geddes)
 Printing (Chairman: Sen. Henry B. Anthony; Vice Chairman: Rep. William M. Springer)
 Public Buildings and Grounds (Chairman: Sen. William Mahone; Vice Chairman: Rep. J. Hyatt Smith)
 State, War and Navy Department Building

Caucuses
 Democratic (House)
 Democratic (Senate)

Employees

Legislative branch agency directors 
 Architect of the Capitol: Edward Clark
 Librarian of Congress: Ainsworth Rand Spofford 
 Public Printer of the United States: John D. Defrees, until 1882 
 Sterling P. Rounds, from 1882

Senate 
 Secretary: John C. Burch, elected March 24, 1879, died July 28, 1881
 Francis E. Shober, (Acting), elected October 25, 1881
 Librarian: P. J. Pierce
 Sergeant at Arms: Richard J. Bright
 Chaplain: Joseph J. Bullock (Presbyterian)

House of Representatives 
 Clerk: George M. Adams, until December 5, 1881
 Edward McPherson, from December 5, 1881
 Sergeant at Arms: John G. Thompson, until December 5, 1881
 George W. Hooker, from December 5, 1881
 Doorkeeper: Walter P. Brownlow, elected December 5, 1881
 Postmaster: Henry Sherwood, elected December 5, 1881
 Clerk at the Speaker's Table: J. Guilford White
 Michael Sullivan
 Reading Clerks: Charles N. Clisbee (D) and Neill S. Brown Jr. (R)
 Chaplain: William P. Harrison (Methodist), until December 5, 1881
 Frederick D. Power (Disciples of Christ), from December 5, 1881

See also 
 1880 United States elections (elections leading to this Congress)
 1880 United States presidential election
 1880–81 United States Senate elections
 1880 United States House of Representatives elections
 1882 United States elections (elections during this Congress, leading to the next Congress)
 1882–83 United States Senate elections
 1882 United States House of Representatives elections

Notes

References

External links
 The Great Senate Deadlock of 1881
 Biographical Directory of the U.S. Congress
 U.S. House of Representatives: House History
 U.S. Senate: Statistics and Lists